Neil James Farnsworth (born 8 May 1977) is an English cricketer.  Farnsworth is a right-handed batsman who bowls right-arm off break.  He was born in Ashford, Surrey.

Farnsworth represented the Surrey Cricket Board in a single List A cricket match against Shropshire County Cricket Club in the 2000 NatWest Trophy. In his only List A match, he scored 10 runs.

He last played club cricket for Ashtead Cricket Club in the Surrey Championship.

References

External links
Neil Farnsworth at Cricinfo
Neil Farnsworth at CricketArchive

1977 births
Living people
People from Ashford, Surrey
People from Surrey
English cricketers
Surrey Cricket Board cricketers